This is a list of episodes for the sixth season (1991–92) of the television series Married... with Children.

Following his marriage to Marcy after a drunken encounter, Jefferson D'Arcy (Ted McGinley) is promoted to series regular. Throughout the season, both Peg and Marcy were pregnant, as Katey Sagal was pregnant in real life. Sagal's child was stillborn six weeks before term, causing her to miss four episodes of this season.  At the end of the season's 11th episode,
"Al Bundy, Shoe Dick", the women's pregnancies were revealed to be merely part of one of Al's nightmares. This season also had Steve Rhoades return for one episode, Kelly become the "Verminator", and the Bundys travel to England. Additionally, this season introduced Bud's hip-hop-inspired alter ego "Grandmaster B", concocted to help him with women, which continued after the dream revelation by having Al ask Bud about the nickname and Bud deciding that he likes it enough to use it.

Amanda Bearse and Ted McGinley both were absent for two episodes.

Episodes

References

1991 American television seasons
1992 American television seasons
06